

This is a list of the National Register of Historic Places listings in Wyandotte County, Kansas.

This is intended to be a complete list of the properties and districts on the National Register of Historic Places in Wyandotte County, Kansas, United States. Latitude and longitude coordinates are provided for many National Register properties and districts; these locations may be seen together in a map.

There are 43 properties and districts listed on the National Register in the county, including one National Historic Landmark.  Another two properties were once listed but have been removed.

Current listings

|}

Former listing

|}

See also

 List of National Historic Landmarks in Kansas
 National Register of Historic Places listings in Kansas

References

Wyandotte County